Quercus × basaseachicensis is a species of oak tree in the Fagaceae (beech) family. It is thought to be a hybrid of Quercus depressipes and Quercus rugosa.  It is native to the states of Chihuahua and Durango in Mexico, in which there are five known populations (all of which are believed to be small). Both parents are placed in section Quercus.

References

basaseachicensis
Endemic oaks of Mexico
Trees of Chihuahua (state)
Trees of Durango
Endangered biota of Mexico
Endangered flora of North America
Taxonomy articles created by Polbot
Flora of the Sierra Madre Occidental